Stigmella nubimontana is a moth of the family Nepticulidae. It is found in the cloud forest of the high Andes in Ecuador.

The wingspan is 5.2-5.3 mm for males. Adults have been found from February to early March.

The larvae feed on Rubus species. They mine the leaves of their host plant. The mine is usually located between two leaf veins. It consists of a compact gallery which resembles an elongated blotch. The start of the mine is slender and filled with dark brown  frass. Later, the mine widens considerably and the frass is deposited in a broad but compact central line with clear margins. The final part of the mine is very broad, sometimes even a blotch. Here, the granulated dark brown frass is deposited irregularly or into a slender central line. The final part of the mine usually covers the beginning of the mine.

External links
New Neotropical Nepticulidae (Lepidoptera) from the western Amazonian rainforest and the Andes of Ecuador

Nepticulidae
Moths of South America
Moths described in 2002